Llanllibio is a hamlet in the community of Bodedern, Ynys Môn, Wales, named after Saint Llibio which is 138.5 miles (222.9 km) from Cardiff and 223 miles (358.9 km) from London. St Llibio's Church, Llanllibio is now demolished. 

Madam Wen the romantic character in the 17th century novels of William David Owen,  was born in the parish in 1874.

References

See also 
 List of localities in Wales by population

Villages in Anglesey